Luperaltica is a genus of flea beetles in the family Chrysomelidae. There are at least four described species in Luperaltica from North America, and others from Mexico.

North American species
 Luperaltica nigripalpis (J. L. LeConte, 1859)
 Luperaltica nitida Wilcox, 1953
 Luperaltica semiflava (Fall in Fall & Cockerell, 1907)
 Luperaltica senilis (Say, 1824)

References

Further reading

 
 

Alticini
Chrysomelidae genera
Taxa named by George Robert Crotch